Eberhard H. Zeidler may refer to:

 Eberhard Heinrich Zeidler (1926–2022), German-Canadian architect
 Eberhard Hermann Erich Zeidler (1940–2016), German mathematician